Kim Nocifs also known by his stage name K.I.M. (born November 15, 1986) is a French beatboxer, known for electronic and dubstep style beats. K.I.M. began beatboxing in 2007, making his international début in 2009 at the French Team Beatbox Championship. With his group Nocifs Sound System, K.I.M won the competition.  He also won the same competition the following year. In 2011, K.I.M. won the French Beatbox Championship. He is now a member of Team Paname with their French slogan: "Le beatbox c’est mieux maintenant."

Contests 
 French Team Beatbox Championship 2009 - first place
 French Team Beatbox Championship 2010 - first place
 French Beatbox Championship 2010 - semi-finals
 French Beatbox Championship 2011 - first place
 French Beatbox Championship 2013 - second place
Grand Beatbox Battle 2013 Showcase - fourth place
 Beatbox Battle World Championship 2012 - top eight
 Emperor Of The Mic Beatbox Battle 2012 - quarter finals
 TKO - Paris, 2011
 J'attaque du Mic - Paris, 2010

References 

1986 births
Living people
Beatboxers
Musicians from Paris